Ravno Selo is a village in Serbia. It is situated in the municipality of Vrbas, in the South Bačka District, Vojvodina province. The village has a Serb ethnic majority and its population numbering 3,478 people (2002 census).

Name
In Serbian, the village is known as Ravno Selo (Равно Село), in German as Alt-Schowe, and in Hungarian as Ósóvé. Other Serbian names used for the village are: Ravno (Равно), Stare Šove (Старе Шове), and Šove (Шове).

History
The village was first recorded in the end of the 15th century (between 1484 and 1502). During Ottoman rule (16th-17th century), the village of Šove was populated by Serbs. In 1786, Germans settled in the village as well. In 1820, population of Šove numbered 2,598 inhabitants, of whom 1,643 were Serbs. In 1893, the population of the village numbered 2,136 inhabitants, including 1,436 Serbs, 653 Germans, 15 Hungarians, and 32 others. After World War II, as a consequence of the war events, the German population fled from the village.

Ethnic groups (2002 census)

Serbs = 2,702 (77.69%)
Montenegrins = 274 (7.88%)
others.

Historical population

1961: 4,378
1971: 3,814
1981: 3,636
1991: 3,579
2002: 3,478

Notable people
 Jožef Velker (1913–1995), former footballer
 Lazar Ristovski  (b. 1952), actor

Film festival
On 23–25 June 2017 actor and producer Lazar Ristovski, who was born in the region, organized the first edition of the international Ravno Selo Film Festival dedicated to the first and second film of young directors. Since 2017 the Ravno Selo Film Festival is held annually. Festival director is Petar Ristovski.

See also
List of places in Serbia
List of cities, towns and villages in Vojvodina

References

Slobodan Ćurčić, Broj stanovnika Vojvodine, Novi Sad, 1996.

Places in Bačka
South Bačka District